Fakhr ad-Dīn ibn Fulān al-Ḥanafī al-Burdwānī (d. 1199 AH / 1785 CE), or alternatively Fakhruddin Bardhamani, was an 18th-century Islamic scholar from Burdwan in western Bengal. According to Abd al-Hayy al-Lucknawi, he was one of the leading scholars in the fields of Islamic logic and hikmah during his time.

Biography
Fakhr ad-Din was born into a Bengali Muslim family from the village of Jilu in Burdwan, then part of the Bengal Subah, where he was raised. He later left Bengal for higher Islamic studies. Fakhr ad-Din became a senior student of Muhammad Barakah ibn Abd ar-Rahman of Allahabad, and a follower of the Hanafi madhhab. 

After completing his studies, he returned to Bengal where he became taught Islamic studies, logic and hikmah. He was known to have been an ascetic. Whenever his servant fell ill or had another excuse, Fakhr ad-Din would carry the food on his head himself to bring it to his students. As his popularity grew, his influence was noticed by the British East India Company. Warren Hastings, the Governor-General of the Presidency of Fort William, wished to visit him and eventually managed to do so. However, Fakhr ad-Din was not pleased and did not accept any gifts from Hastings.

Fakhr ad-Din al-Burdwani died in 1199 AH (1785 CE).

See also
Ghulam Mustafa Burdwani

Further reading
Bahr-e-Zakhkhar

References

Bengali Muslim scholars of Islam
People from Bardhaman
18th-century Bengalis
18th-century Muslim theologians
Hanafis
1785 deaths
18th-century Muslim scholars of Islam